Huilgol Narayana Rao (4 October 1884 - 4 July 1971) was a popular Indian playwright in the modern Kannada literature  and a freedom fighter. Narayana Rao is best known as the poet who composed the then state anthem of the Karnataka State Udayavagali Namma Cheluva Kannada Nadu which heralded the birth of Karnataka . The popular song was sung by Huilgol Narayan Rao and Gangubai Hanagal at Karnataka Unification Conference held in 1924, which was also the venue which hosted the 1924 Indian National Congress Session in Belgaum.

References

Indian male dramatists and playwrights
1884 births
People from Gadag district
1971 deaths
20th-century Indian dramatists and playwrights
Dramatists and playwrights from Karnataka
20th-century Indian male writers